Markle may refer to:

People
 Abraham Markle (1770–1826), Upper Canadian businessman and politician
 Alvan Markle (1861–1931), American banker, businessman, engineer, and inventor
 Cliff Markle (1894–1974), American baseball pitcher
 Fletcher Markle (1921–1991), Canadian radio personality
 Jack Markle (1907–1956), Canadian ice hockey player
 Meghan Markle (born 1981), American former actress and now Duchess of Sussex
 Family of Meghan, Duchess of Sussex, which includes:
 Thomas Markle Sr. (born 1945), American retired lighting director; father of Meghan, Duchess of Sussex
 Peter Markle (born 1952), American television director
 Roger A. Markle (1933–2020), American mining engineer and executive
 Sandra Markle (born 1946), American author of children's books
 Wilson Markle (born 1938), Canadian engineer who invented the film colorization process

Places
 Markle, East Lothian, a village in Scotland
 Markle Castle, ruined castle in Scotland
 Markle, Indiana, a town in the United States

Other uses
 Markle's sign, clinical sign in the right lower quadrant of the abdomen
 Markle Foundation, American charitable organisation concerned with technology, health care, and national security
 Markle Windsor Foundation (aka MWX and Sussex Royal), former UK charitable organisation (now dissolved)